Kari is a town and a nagar panchayat in Tikamgarh district in the Indian state of Madhya Pradesh.

Demographics
 India census, Kari had a population of 8686. Males constitute 53% of the population and females 47%. Kari has an average literacy rate of 36%, lower than the national average of 59.5%: male literacy is 47%, and female literacy is 24%. In Kari, 20% of the population is under 6 years of age.

References

Cities and towns in Tikamgarh district